The Malayan tree rat (Pithecheir parvus) is a species of rodent in the family Muridae.
It is found only in Malaysia.

References

Rats of Asia
Pithecheir
Endemic fauna of Malaysia
Rodents of Malaysia
Mammals described in 1916
Taxonomy articles created by Polbot